The Amatory Experiences of a Surgeon is a pornographic novel by James Campbell Reddie under the pseudonym of "James Campbell" published in London (although the title page asserts Moscow) in 1881.  The narrative gives a view of Victorian abortion.

References

 Iwan Bloch, "Anthropological Studies on the Strange Sexual Practices of All Races and All Ages", Minerva Group, 2001, p. 171
 Alan Norman Bold, "The Sexual dimension in literature", Vision Press, 1983, p. 116
 Steven Marcus, "The Other Victorians: a study of sexuality and pornography in mid-nineteenth-Century England", Transaction Publishers, 2008, pp. 235–247
 Gowan Dawson, "Darwin, literature and Victorian respectability", Cambridge studies in nineteenth-century literature and culture 57, Cambridge University Press, 2007, p. 128

British pornography
Pornographic novels
1881 British novels
Novels about abortion
Works published under a pseudonym
Novels by James Campbell Reddie
Victorian era